Camil Baltazar (pen name of Leibu Goldenstein or Leopold Goldstein; August 25, 1902 in Focşani- April 27, 1977 in Bucharest) was a Romanian-Jewish poet.

Selected works
Vecernii, 1923
Flaute de mătase, 1923
Reculegeri în nemurirea ta, 1925
Biblice, 1926
Strigări trupeşti lângă glesne, 1927
Cina cea de taină, 1929
Poeme vechi şi noi, 1931
Întoarcerea poetului la uneltele sale, 1937
Tărâm transparent, 1939

References

Romanian male poets
People from Focșani
1902 births
1977 deaths
Jewish Romanian writers banned by the Antonescu regime
20th-century Romanian poets
20th-century Romanian male writers